Albrighton may refer to:

Albrighton, Bridgnorth, a large village and civil parish in Shropshire, England, north-west of Wolverhampton
Albrighton, Shrewsbury, a small village in North Shropshire, England, north of Shrewsbury
Albrighton Hunt, a UK foxhound pack
Albrighton (surname)